De La Salle University (DLSU) is a Catholic private Lasallian university in Malate, Manila, Philippines. It was founded in 1911 by De La Salle Brothers as the De La Salle College in Paco, Manila with Blimond Pierre serving as its first director. DLSU traces its founding to Manila Archbishop Jeremiah James Harty. He believed that the establishment of a La Salle school in Manila was instrumental in preempting the spread of Protestantism in the Philippines through the arrival of the Thomasites and Protestant missions. His request would later be endorsed in 1907 by Pope Pius X. An envoy of De La Salle Brothers arrived in 1910.

More than a century ago, the De La Salle College (DLSC) was established as an exclusive all boys' elementary and high school. The pre-war grade school and high school departments of DLSC were finally dissolved in 1968 and 1978 respectively. DLSU currently offers coeducational undergraduate and graduate degree programs through its seven colleges and one school specializing in varied disciplines, including business, engineering, computer sciences, education and liberal arts. DLSU, granted university status in February 1975, is the oldest constituent of De La Salle Philippines (DLSP), a network of 16 Lasallian institutions established in 2006 to replace the De La Salle University System.

The Lasallians affiliated with De La Salle University include over 100,000 alumni, 888 faculty, honorary degree recipients and university administrators. Among them are National Artists of the Philippines, Ramon Magsaysay Awardees, officials of the Catholic Church and the government of the Philippines

Alumni and faculty

Alumni

Fields with a – are unknown; NA – not applicable

Faculty

Honorary degree recipients

DA – Doctor of Arts; DBM – Doctor of Business Management; EdD – Doctor of Education; LHD – Doctor of Humane Letters; DHum – Doctor of Humanities; LLD – Doctor of Laws; LittD – Doctor of Letters; DMgt – Doctor of Management; DNatSc – Doctor of Natural Science; PedD – Doctor of Pedagogy; PhD – Doctor of Philosophy; ScD – Doctor of Science

Presidents

De La Salle University has had 21 presidents, including two acting presidents. The first, Antony Ferdinand Kilbourn, acted in Lucian Athanasius Reinhart's capacity during his return to the United States while the second, Naj Robosa, completed Reinhart's office when he died in 1950.

References

External links
De La Salle Alumni Association
De La Salle University

De la Salle
Lists of alumni by university or college in the Philippines
Lists of Filipino people by school affiliation